The Serbian Radical Party (SRS) is a Serbian nationalist party in Serbia.

It may also refer to:

Historical parties
People's Radical Party, Serbian and Yugoslav party active between 1881 and 1945.
Serb People's Radical Party, Serb minority party in Austria-Hungary.
Yugoslav Radical Union, Serbian party active between 1934 and 1941, led by Milan Stojadinović.
Serbian Radical Party, Serb minority party in Croatia active between 1992 and 1997.

Other current parties
Serbian Radical Party of Republika Srpska, party in Bosnia and Herzegovina.
SRS "Dr. Vojislav Šešelj", party in Bosnia and Herzegovina.
Party of Serb Radicals, Serb minority party in Montenegro.

See also
Serb People's Party (disambiguation), several parties